"Wor Geordie's lost his penka" (or ... his liggie) is a Geordie folk song, the origins of which are unknown. The 'penka' was the large marble that the other marbles or 'liggies' were rolled at, in a game of marbles.

Yorkshire folklore
British folk songs